Plunge is the second studio album by Fever Ray, an alias of Swedish musician Karin Dreijer. It was released on 27 October 2017 through Rabid Records. It is their first album in nearly eight years, following their 2009 eponymous debut. The album was largely recorded in Dreijer's Stockholm studio in collaboration with producers Paula Temple, Deena Abdelwahed, Nídia, Tami T, Peder Mannerfelt, and Johannes Berglund.

The album was preceded by the lead single "To the Moon and Back", which was released a week before the album. It was later supported by two more singles, "Wanna Sip" and "IDK About You". The album received acclaim from music critics, who praised its directly political and sexual themes alongside deconstructed club beats and catchy electronic hooks.

Release and promotion
Plunge was surprise released on 27 October 2017 with no prior announcement. It was released a week after the release of the lead single, "To the Moon and Back". Prior to the release of the single on 20 October, Dreijer shared two teaser videos titled "Switch Seeks Same" and "A New Friend" on 16 and 18 October, respectively. Both teasers included the word "Plunge", leading to speculations of a new album. The first teaser samples the songs "Red Trails" and "An Itch", while the second teaser samples "This Country". The album was released physically on vinyl and CD on 23 February 2018.

On 23 January 2018, Dreijer released a music video for the second single "Wanna Sip". On 16 February, they released a music video for "IDK About You", which was released as the third single on 1 March.

In February and March 2018, Dreijer headed on a European tour in support of the album, and embarked on a North American tour in May 2018.

Composition
Plunge contains aggressive beats and synths, and showcases a more varied sound than that of Fever Ray. Release Magazine described the album as "some absolutely cracking experimental electronic pop." Dreijer's voice is notably not hidden behind pitch-shifting as it was on Fever Ray, but instead, is "sharpened and pushed high in the mix, the better to emphasize [their] strange, elastic, playful diction." Pitchfork stated that the album "feels much more manic" and "conflicted" than their debut, while noting that in opposition to the numbness and "penumbral chill" of Fever Ray, Plunge "puts the heat and light back into [their] alias: the fever, the radiance, the beams emanating from red-ringed eyes." Lyrically, the album focuses on themes of love and desire with a striking candor. It features Dreijer's most verbose, dense and direct lyrics, and was said to be "political in a way Dreijer has not been before."

Critical reception

Plunge received widespread acclaim from critics. At Metacritic, which assigns a normalized rating out of 100 to reviews from mainstream publications, the album received an average score of 87, based on 21 reviews. Pitchfork writer Philip Sherburne called it a "thrillingly restless album", "riskier than anything [they have] made before. It is sometimes harsh, often dissonant, frequently audacious." Nina Corcoran of Consequence of Sound said Dreijer "pushes [themself] to new limits, and it feels entirely individualistic," continuing: "The instrumentation and Dreijer's primal delivery of the lyrics make Plunge a gripping follow-up that upstages its predecessor. Fever Ray made you self-aware of your mind. Plunge makes you self-aware of your body, what it's capable of, and how good it feels to move in your skin." Adam Turner-Heffer from Drowned in Sound wrote, "Dreijer has cemented [their] place within alternative music's dynasty, and it's refreshing to hear an outwardly queer and fiercely political artist convey a clear message without having the music, performance or reception fall over the potential weight of those themes. For as much as Plunge quite clearly contains these themes, it can and will be enjoyed as a universally creditable piece of brilliantly constructed art, and that is Dreijer's real success here." Writing for Vice, Robert Christgau lauded Dreijer's sex-positive message: "The title instrumental leads directly to 'I want to run my fingers up your pussy' and an open if complicated beyond. Take the plunge, [they're] hinting. It'll be fine. You'll be glad you did."

The A.V. Clubs Matt Gerardi praised the album, stating that it lies "in its ability to change on a dime, to provoke—intermittently and from one listen to the next—confusion, shock, laughter, enlightenment, and ultimately admiration." Spin critic Arielle Gordon called it Dreijer's boldest album. In his review for Pretty Much Amazing, Colin Groundwater said, "Plunge is a worthy addition to Dreijer's career discography, and fans of Fever Ray and the Knife are sure to enjoy it. It's an energetic and erotic record that may very well soundtrack some of the freakier parties you attend this fall. Still, it doesn't capture the full scope of Dreijer's ambition." The Skinny gave the album a perfect score, with Katie Hawthorne deeming it as "endlessly innovative", writing: "Plunge befits the return of an iconic creative voice. Dreijer's politics are written on [their] body, and [they're] asking you to dive in. You won't need telling twice." Andrew Ryce of Resident Advisor wrote, "It never feels like Dreijer is playing catch-up. Plunge is the natural next step, a realization of impulses that have long lain dormant, or at least unrecognized." Andy Jex of MusicOMH wrote, "This is a joyous artistic rebirth, its creator shaking [their] tail feathers, pushing [their] own boundaries and immersed in emotion and whim brought out from within." AllMusic gave the album 4 and ½ out of 5 stars, with reviewer Heather Phares concluding that "The journey to dive into commitment that Dreijer takes [their] listeners on with Plunge boasts more moods and colors than Fever Ray's debut, or any single Knife album; ultimately, it's some of [their]. most powerful work with yet."

Accolades

Track listing

Notes
 signifies an additional producer

Personnel
Credits adapted from Mute Records' official website.

Musicians

 Fever Ray – vocals 
 Tami T – vocals 
 Sara Parkman – violin 
 Aldo Arechar – flutes

Technical personnel

 Fever Ray – production 
 Tami T – production 
 Johannes Berglund – production ; additional production ; mixing 
 Peder Mannerfelt – production 
 Paula Temple – production 
 Nídia – production 
 Deena Abdelwahed – production 
 Mandy Parnell – mastering

Charts

Release history

References

2017 albums
Fever Ray albums
Electropop albums
Experimental music albums by Swedish artists